Andrej Porázik (27 June 1977 in Bratislava) is a former Slovak footballer who recently played for MFK Dubnica.

References

External links
 Andrej Porázik at official club website (fkdubnica.sk) 

1977 births
Living people
Slovak footballers
Slovakia under-21 international footballers
AS Trenčín players
FK Dubnica players
FK Inter Bratislava players
Dyskobolia Grodzisk Wielkopolski players
MŠK Žilina players
Association football forwards
Slovak Super Liga players
Ekstraklasa players
Slovak expatriate footballers
Slovak expatriate sportspeople in Poland
Expatriate footballers in Poland
Slovakia international footballers
Footballers from Bratislava